Miss Universe Indonesia or MUID is a beauty pageant and organization that selects the Indonesia's official representative to the Miss Universe pageant.

History
From 1974 up until 1983, Putri Indonesia who owned by Andy Nurhayati Beauty institute Jakarta directorship is the national franchise holder of Indonesia to Miss Universe, wherein it was responsible for selecting the Indonesian women who would represent the Indonesia and compete at the annual Miss Universe pageant. Under Andi Beauty Institute Jakarta, they managed to send seven Indonesian representatives to the Miss Universe pageant in 1974–1977, 1980 and 1982–1983.

In 1997, Puteri Indonesia organization was sending the winner for Miss Universe in 1995, but by 1996, the winner was forced to withdraw from competing at the Miss Universe pageant by the former First Lady, Mrs. Tien Suharto who was the wife of the late second president of the Republic of Indonesia, Suharto. Puteri Indonesia winner was again sent to the Miss Universe after receive a big supports and permissions from Megawati Soekarnoputri who was chosen as the first-ever Female President of Indonesia. Started with Artika Sari Devi who was representing Indonesia at the Miss Universe 2005 in Thailand, until Laksmi Shari De-Neefe Suardana in 2022. Under Puteri Indonesia organization, they managed to send nineteen Indonesian representatives to the Miss Universe pageant in 1995–1996, 2005–2020 and 2022.

In 8 February 2023, the Miss Universe franchise in Indonesia was officially granted to a new organizing body with Datin Wira Poppy Capella Swastika as its national director and Eldwen Wang Jin-Seok as its CEO and Communication Director, paving the way for the creation of the new Miss Universe Indonesia Organization under PT. Capella Swastika Karya, Inc. Under the new organization, a separate, standalone pageant is now responsible for the selection of the future Miss Universe Indonesia titleholders from 2023 onwards. The press launch of the pageants in Nusa Dua, Bali was attended by the Miss Universe 2022 R'Bonney Gabriel, 2nd runner-up and top 5 of Miss Universe 2022, Andreína Martínez and Gabriëla Dos Santos, respectively.

Gallery of titleholders

Titleholders

Editions

Representatives at Miss Universe

This is a list of Indonesian women who have represent Indonesia at the Miss Universe beauty pageant. Indonesia has competed 26 times, placed 8 times and won several special awards, including Best in National Costume in 2007, 2014; Popular Vote in 2009; Miss Photogenic in 2017; Miss Phoenix Smile in 2016; Miss Clairol Herbal Essences in 1995.

Number of wins by province

See also

 Miss Indonesia
 Puteri Indonesia
 Putri Nusantara
 Miss Mega Bintang Indonesia
 Indonesia at major beauty pageants
 Big Four international beauty pageants
 List of beauty pageants

References

External links

Beauty pageants in Indonesia
Recurring events established in 2023
Organizations established in 2023
2023 establishments in Indonesia
Indonesia
Indonesian awards
Lists of award winners
Lists of women in beauty pageants